A list of thriller films released in the 1990s.

Notes

1990s
Thriller